The 1906 Paris–Roubaix was the 11th edition of the Paris–Roubaix, a classic one-day cycle race in France. The single day event was held on 15 April 1906 and stretched  from Paris to its end in a velodrome in Roubaix. The winner was Henri Cornet from France.

Results

References

Paris–Roubaix
Paris-Roubaix
Paris-Roubaix
Paris-Roubaix